Soltanabad (also Romanized as Solţānābād) is a village in Darbqazi Rural District, in the Central District of Nishapur County, Razavi Khorasan Province, Iran. At the 2006 census, its population was 50, in 16 families.

References 

Populated places in Nishapur County